Steffie van der Peet (born 10 September 1999) is a Dutch professional racing cyclist. In October 2019, she won the bronze medal in the women's team sprint event at the 2019 UEC European Track Championships.

References

External links
 

1999 births
Living people
Dutch female cyclists
Cyclists from The Hague
21st-century Dutch women